Jaime Aceves Pérez (born 2 September 1961) is a Mexican politician from the National Action Party. From 2000 to 2003 he served as Deputy of the LVIII Legislature of the Mexican Congress representing Jalisco.

He studied law at the Universidad Veracruzana and mechanical engineering/communications at the University of Guadalajara.

References

1961 births
Living people
Politicians from Guadalajara, Jalisco
Members of the Chamber of Deputies (Mexico) for Jalisco
National Action Party (Mexico) politicians
21st-century Mexican politicians
Universidad Veracruzana alumni
University of Guadalajara alumni
Deputies of the LVIII Legislature of Mexico